Mitsumune (written: 光宗) is a Japanese surname. Notable people with the surname include:

, Japanese actress and model
, Japanese composer

Japanese-language surnames